Richard J. Coughlan (born 7 April 1974) is an Irish professional golfer who played on the European Tour and the PGA Tour.

Career 
In 1997, Coughlan became the first player in history to qualify for the PGA Tour and the European Tour in his rookie season. John E. Morgan duplicated this feat in 2002. Coughlan chose to concentrate on playing in the United States full-time, and finished a career-best 9th at the 1998 B.C. Open, but lost his card at the end of the season. He regained his card for 2001 at the Q-School, but again failed to hold onto it. He last appeared on the Tour in 2003. Coughlan also played on the Nationwide Tour until the end of 2005.

Team appearances
Amateur
Jacques Léglise Trophy (representing Great Britain & Ireland): 1990 (winners), 1991 (winners)
European Youths' Team Championship (representing Ireland): 1992, 1994 (winners)
Palmer Cup (representing Great Britain & Ireland): 1997
Walker Cup (representing Great Britain & Ireland): 1997

See also
1997 PGA Tour Qualifying School graduates
2000 PGA Tour Qualifying School graduates

References

External links

Irish male golfers
European Tour golfers
PGA Tour golfers
Clemson Tigers men's golfers
Sportspeople from County Offaly
1974 births
Living people